Colette, une femme libre is a 2004 Biographical miniseries which explored the life of Colette.

Cast
 Marie Trintignant as Colette
 Wladimir Yordanoff as Henry Gauthier-Villars
 Lambert Wilson as Henry de Jouvenel
 Barbara Schulz as Polaire
 Rüdiger Vogler as Captain Colette
 Jacques Higelin as Georges Wague
 Lio as Marguerite Moreno
 Catherine Jacob as Missy
 Caroline Proust as Lotte
 Marie-José Nat as Sido
 Chiara Caselli as Georgie Duval
 Jean-Michel Fête as Léo
 Yves Lambrecht as Achille
 Roman Kolinka as Bertrand
 Ruta Latinyte as Meg
 Sergio Peris-Mencheta as Fred
 Carole Richert as Isabelle
 Arturas Zukauskas as Agent Choisy
 Dominique Besnehard

Production
This is the last film of Marie Trintignant, who was killed by her then-boyfriend Bertrand Cantat during the shooting in July 2003.

Awards

References

External links
 

Films directed by Nadine Trintignant
2000s French television miniseries
2000s French television series
2004 French television series debuts
French documentary television series
Colette
2004 French television series endings
Films scored by Philippe Sarde